This is a list of fantasy television programs. It includes original television movies, miniseries and television serials in the fantasy genre and its various subgenres. This list excludes fantasy films originally made for the cinema, which are listed at List of fantasy films.

Television movies and mini series
 The Adventures of a Two-Minute Werewolf (1985)
 Angels in America (mini series)
 Dark Kingdom: The Dragon King
 Descendants 
 Descendants 2 (2017)
 Descendants 3 (2019)
 Dungeons & Dragons: Wrath of the Dragon God
 The Cave of the Golden Rose
 Gormenghast (TV serial)
 Hercules and the Amazon Women
 Hercules and the Circle of Fire
 Hercules and the Lost Kingdom
 Hercules in the Maze of the Minotaur
 Hercules in the Underworld
 The Hobbit (1977 film)
 Jack and the Beanstalk: The Real Story
 Jason and the Argonauts (miniseries)
 Kindred: The Embraced
 Earthsea (miniseries)
 Merlin (miniseries)
 Merlin's Apprentice
 The Mists of Avalon (mini series)
 Neverwhere
 Nick Knight (film)
 Over the Garden Wall
 Salem's Lot (2004 miniseries)
 Snow Queen (2002 film)
 Tales from the Neverending Story
Tin Man (miniseries)

Television series

Canada

 The Adventures of Sinbad (1996–1998)
 Beastmaster (1999–2002)
 Blood Ties (2007)
Camelot (2011)
 Captain Flamingo (2006–2010)
 Forever Knight (1992–1996)
 Friday the 13th: The Series (1987–1990)
 The Listener (2009–2014)
 Missing (2003–2006)
 My Little Pony: Friendship Is Magic (2010-2019)
 Mysticons (2017–2018)
 Lost Girl (2010–2015)
 The Odyssey (1992–1994)
 World of Quest (2008–2009)

China
Chinese Paladin (2005)
The Little Fairy (2006)
 Chinese Paladin 3 (2009)
 Xuan-Yuan Sword: Scar of Sky (2012)
 Swords of Legends (2014)
Love Weaves Through a Millennium (2015) 
The Journey of Flower (2015)
The Lost Tomb (2015) 
Wu Xin: The Monster Killer (2015) 
Novoland: Castle in the Sky (2016)
The Mystic Nine (2016)
Ice Fantasy (2016)
Noble Aspirations (2016)
Candle in the Tomb (2016-2017)
Three Lives Three Worlds, Ten Miles of Peach Blossoms (2017)
Tribes and Empires: Storm of Prophecy (2017) 
The Starry Night, The Starry Sea (2017)
Fighter of the Destiny (2017)
Ancient Love Song (2017)
Martial Universe (2017)
Ever Night (2018)
 Filly Funtasia (2019)
 Novoland: Pearl Eclipse (2021)
 Shining for One Thing (2021)

France
 Argai: The Prophecy (2000)
 Dragon Flyz (1996-7)
 Gawayn
 The Mysterious Cities of Gold (1982-3)
 Spartakus and the Sun Beneath the Sea (1985-7)
 Ulysses 31 (1981-2)

India
The Adventures of Hatim
Agadam Bagdam Tigdam
Akkad Bakkad Bambey Bo
Aladdin
Aladdin - Naam Toh Suna Hoga
Alif Laila
Arslaan
Aryamaan – Brahmaand Ka Yodha
Badi Door Se Aaye Hai
Baal Veer
Baalveer Returns
Betaal Pachisi
Bhoothnath
Brahmarakshas
Chandrakanta
Chandrakanta (2017 TV series)
Chi and Me
Ek Deewaana Tha
Gaju Bhai
Gharwali Uparwali
Gharwali Uparwali Aur Sunny
Ghayab Aya
Hatim
Hero - Bhakti Hi Shakti Hai
Ichhapyaari Naagin
Janbaaz Sindbad
Jeannie Aur Juju
Junior G
Kahani Chandrakanta Ki
Karma 
Kavach... Kaali Shaktiyon Se
Maan Na Maan Mein Tera Mehmaan
The Magic Make-Up Box
Maha Kumbh: Ek Rahasaya, Ek Kahani
Maharakshak: Aryan
Maharakshak: Devi
Mayavi Maling
Mohe Rang De
MTV Fanaah
Nagin
Naagini
Naaginn - Waadon Ki Agniparikshaa
Naagarjuna – Ek Yoddha
Nazar
Ninja Pandav
Paap-O-Meter
Prem Ya Paheli – Chandrakanta
Princess Dollie Aur Uska Magic Bag
Pritam Pyare Aur Woh
Pyaar Kii Ye Ek Kahaani
Qayamat Ki Raat
Raajkumar Aaryyan
Rahe Tera Aashirwaad
Rudra Ke Rakshak
Sasural Simar Ka
Seven
Shaka Laka Boom Boom
Shaktimaan
Shaktimaan: The Animated Series
Shararat
Singhasan Battisi
Son Pari
Super Sisters - Chalega Pyar Ka Jaadu
Thief of Baghdad
Vartmaan
Vicky & Vetaal
Vikram Aur Betaal
Yam Hain Hum
Yam Kisi Se Kam Nahin
Yom
Zoran

Italy
The Cave of the Golden Rose
Alisea and the Dream Prince
The Dragon Ring
Houses of Doom
Brivido Giallo
The Princess and the Pauper
The Sword and the Heart
The Chosen
A come Andromeda
Odissey
Il segno del comando
E.S.P.
Gamma
Ritratto di donna velata
The marbel faun
Racconti fantastici
Mia and Me
Winx Club

Japan
 I was the only kid that was kind
 Fairy Tail
 Fullmetal Alchemist
 Gosei Sentai Dairanger
 Hyakujuu Sentai Gaoranger
 Hikari Sentai Maskman
 Juken Sentai Gekiranger
 Kamen Rider Agito
 Kamen Rider Ryuki
 Kamen Rider Hibiki
 Kamen Rider Kiva
 Kamen Rider Wizard
 Kamen Rider Gaim
 Kamen Rider Ghost
 Kyōryū Sentai Zyuranger
 Mahou Sentai Magiranger
 Monkey (TV series)
 Ninja Sentai Kakuranger
 Ninpuu Sentai Hurricaneger
 Pretty Guardian Sailor Moon
 Samurai Sentai Shinkenger
 Seijuu Sentai Gingaman
 Shuriken Sentai Ninninger
 Naruto Shippuden
 Taiyo Sentai Sun Vulcan
 Tensou Sentai Goseiger

Pakistan
Belapur Ki Dayan
Dil Nawaz
Mera Saaya
Naagin
Saaya

Philippines
Panday (2005 TV series)
Atlantika
Captain Barbell (TV series)
Darna (2005 TV series)
Darna (2009 TV series)
Dyosa
Encantadia
Encantadia: Pag-ibig Hanggang Wakas
Etheria: Ang Ikalimang Kaharian ng Encantadia
Juan dela Cruz
Kampanerang Kuba
Komiks (TV series)
Krystala
Leya, Ang Pinakamagandang Babae Sa Ilalim Ng Lupa
Majika
Marina (TV series)
Marinara (TV series)
Mulawin
Pintados
Spirits (TV series)
Sugo
Super Inggo

South Africa
 The Legend of the Hidden City (1996-8)

South Korea
The Legend (2007)
My Girlfriend Is a Nine-Tailed Fox (2010) 
Secret Garden (2010-2011) 
49 Days (2011)
Padam Padam... The Sound of His and Her Heartbeats (2011)
Arang and the Magistrate (2012) 
Rooftop Prince (2012) 
Queen In-hyun's Man (2012) 
Nine: Nine Time Travels (2013) 
Gu Family Book (2013) 
Master's Sun (2013) 
The only day we didn’t have to work I had a dream about it (2013-2014)
Oh My Ghostess (2015) 
Scholar Who Walks the Night (2015) 
Hey Ghost, Let's Fight (2016) 
W - Two Worlds (2016)
Legend of the Blue Sea (2016-2017)
Guardian: The Lonely and Great God (2016-2017)
Tomorrow With You (2017)
The Bride of Habaek (2017)
A Korean Odyssey (2017)
The King: Eternal Monarch (2020)

United Kingdom
 Ace of Wands (3000-3030)
 A Discovery of Witches (TV series)
 Ashes to Ashes
 Atlantis
 Being Human
 Catweazle
 Children of the Stones
 Demons
 Doctor Who
 Genie in the House
 Good Omens
 Jekyll (TV series) (2007)
 Merlin (2008–12)
 The Moon Stallion
 Out of the Unknown
 The Owl Service
 Primeval
 Robin Hood
 Requiem
 Robin of Sherwood (1984–1986)
 The Tomorrow People
 The Mighty Boosh
 Wizards vs Aliens
 The Worst Witch (2017-)
 The City and the City
 Yonderland

United States
 Adventure Time (2010-2018)
 Amazing Stories (1985–1987)
 American Dragon: Jake Long (2005-2007)
 Angel (1999–2004)
 Angel from Hell (2016)
 Avatar: The Last Airbender (2005-2008)
 Beauty and the Beast (1987–1990)
 Beastmaster (1999–2002)
 The Best Sex Ever (2002–2003)
 Bewitched (1964–1972)
 Big Wolf on Campus (1999–2002)
 Blackstar (1981)
 Blood Ties (2007)
 Buffy the Vampire Slayer (1997–2003)
 Bunnicula (2016-2018)
 Carnival Row (2019-Present)
 Carnivàle (2003–2005)
 Cavemen (2007)
 Charmed (1998–2006)
 Charmed (2018 TV series) (2018–present)
 Cloudy with a Chance of Meatballs: The Series
 Conan the Adventurer (1997–1998)
 Conan the Adventurer (1992–1993)
 Conan and the Young Warriors (1994)
 Constantine (2014–2015)
 Cursed (2020)
 Danny Phantom (2004-2007)
 Dark Crystal: Age of Resistance, The (2019)
 Dark Shadows (1966–1971)
 Dave the Barbarian (2004-2005)
 Dead Like Me (2003–2004)
 The Dead Zone (2002–2007)
 Descendants: School of Secrets (2015)
 Descendants: Wicked World (2015-2017)
 Disenchantment (2018–present)
 Dorothy and the Wizard of Oz (2017-2020)
 Down to Earth (1984–1987)
 Dramaworld (2016) (co-produced with South Korea and China)
 DreamWorks Dragons (2012-2014)
 The Dresden Files (2007)
 Drop Dead Diva (2009–2014)
 Dungeons & Dragons  (1983–1985)
 Early Edition (1996–2000)
 Eastwick (2009–2010)
 The Electric Company (2009–2011)
 Emmanuelle in Space (1994)
 The Emperor's New School (2006-2008)
 The Erotic Traveler (2007)
 The Ex List (2008)
 Faerie Tale Theatre (1982–1987)
 The Fairly OddParents (2001-2017)
 Fantasy Island (1977–1984)
 Fantasy Island (1998–1999)
 Forbidden Science (2009)
 Foster's Home for Imaginary Friends (2004-2009)
 Friday the 13th: The Series (1987–1990)
 The Funny Company (1963)
 Galavant (2015-2016)
 Galtar and the Golden Lance (1985–1986)
 Game of Thrones (2011–2019)
 Ghost Whisperer (2005–2010)
 Gravity Falls (2012-2016)
 The Grim Adventures of Billy & Mandy (2003-2008)
 Grimm (2011–2017)
 He-Man and the Masters of the Universe (1983–1988)
 He-Man and the Masters of the Universe (2002–2004)
 Hercules: The Legendary Journeys (1995–1999)
 Heroes (2006–2010)
 Heroes Reborn (2015–2016)
 Highlander: The Series (1992–1998)
 Highlander: The Raven (1998–1999)
 Highway to Heaven (1984–1989)
 Hotel Erotica (2002–2003)
 Hotel Transylvania: The Series (2017–)
 I Dream of Jeannie (1965–1970)
 The Itsy Bitsy Spider (1994–1996)
 Jennifer Slept Here (1983–1984)
 Joan of Arcadia (2003–2005)
 Just Add Magic (2015-2019)
 Knight Squad (2018–2019)
 Kolchak: The Night Stalker (1974–1975)
 Lost (2004–2010)
 Land of the Lost (1974–1976)
 Land of the Lost (1991–1992)
 The Legend of Korra (2012-2014)
 Legend of the Seeker (2008–2010)
 The Life and Times of Juniper Lee
 The Magicians (2015–2020)
 Manimal (1983)
 The Maxx (1995)
 Medium (2005–2011)
 Mighty Magiswords (2016-2019)
 Moby Dick and Mighty Mightor (1967–1969)
 Monster Squad (1976–1977)
 Mortal Kombat: Conquest (1998)
 The Mystic Knights of Tir Na Nog (1998–1999)
 Nanny and the Professor (1970–1971)
 The New Adventures of He-Man (1990)
 Night Gallery (1969–1973)
 Night Stalker (TV series) (2005)
 Night Visions (2001–2002)
 Ni Hao, Kai-Lan (2007-2011)
 Once Upon a Time (2011–2018)
 Once Upon a Time in Wonderland (2013–2014)
 Out of This World (1987–1991)
 The Originals (2013–2018)
The Outpost (2018–2021)
 The Oz Kids (1996)
 Pirates of Darkwater (1991–1993)
 Power Rangers (1993–)
 Pushing Daisies (2007–2009)
 Regular Show (2010-2017)
 Roar (1997)
 Roswell (1999-2002)
 Sabrina: Superwitch (1977)
 The Sabrina the Teenage Witch Show (1971–1974)
 Sabrina the Teenage Witch (1996–2003)
 Samurai Jack (2001-2017)
 Sanctuary (2008–2011)
 The Secret Circle (2011–2012)
 The Secret Saturdays (2008-2010)
 Shadow and Bone (2021-)
 The Shannara Chronicles (2016–2017)
 Siren (2018-2020)
 Sheena (2000-2002) 
 She-Ra: Princess of Power (1985–1987)
 Shirley Temple's Storybook (1958–1961)
 Sleepy Hollow (2013–2017)
 Special Unit 2 (2001–2002)
 Spawn (1997–1999)
 Steven Universe (2013-)
 The Storyteller (1988–1990)
 Superhero Kindergarten (2021–)
 Supernatural (2005–)
 Tabitha (1976–1978)
 Teen Angel (1997–1998)
 Teen Wolf (1986–1987)
 Teen Wolf (2011–2017)
 That's So Raven (2003-2007)
 Thrills (2001)
 Thundarr the Barbarian (1980–1982)
 Topper (1953-1955)
 Touched by an Angel (1994–2003)
 Tru Calling (2003–2005)
 True Blood (2008–2014)
 Tutenstein (2003–2008)
 The Twilight Zone (1959–1964)
 The Twilight Zone (1985–1989)
 The Twilight Zone (2002–2003)
 Uncle Grandpa (2013-2017)
 The Vampire Diaries (2009–2017)
 Van Helsing (2016–2021)
 The Wheel of Time (2021-)
 Witchblade (2001–2002)
 The Witcher (2019-)
 Witches of East End (2013–2014)
 Wizards and Warriors (1983)
 Wizards of Waverly Place (2007–2012)
 Wonder Woman (1975–1979)
 Wonderfalls (2004)
 Wynonna Earp (2016–2021)
 Xena: Warrior Princess (1995–2001)
 You Wish (1997–1998)
 Young Blades (2005)

Other countries
 Arabela (Czech Republic, 1979-1981)
 The Bureau of Magical Things (Australia, 2018–?)
 Fire Beadman (South Korea, 2005-?)
 Guinevere Jones (Canada/Australia, 2002)
 Heartless (Denmark, 2014–) 
 Wiedźmin (Polish, 2002)
 Maggi & Me (Singapore, 2006-2008)
 Split (Israel, 2009-2012)
 The Elephant Princess (Australia, 2008-2011)
 H2O: Just Add Water (Australia, 2006-2011)
 The New Legends of Monkey (New Zealand, 2018-)

Gothic/horror series
 The 10th Kingdom American Horror Story Angel Being Human Big Wolf on Campus Blood Ties Buffy the Vampire Slayer Charmed Dark Shadows Demons Fear the Walking Dead 
 Jekyll Kolchak: The Night Stalker The Originals Salem's Lot Sanctuary Sleepy Hollow Supernatural Teen Wolf (1986 TV series) Teen Wolf (2011 TV series) True Blood The Twilight Zone The Vampire Diaries The Walking Dead''

See also
 Fantasy television
 Fantaserye
 Fantasy film
 List of science fiction television programs

References

 
Fantasy fiction
Television programs